Saudi Vision 2030 ( ruʾyah al-suʿūdiyah) is a strategic framework to reduce Saudi Arabia's dependence on oil, diversify its economy, and develop public service sectors such as health, education, infrastructure, recreation, and tourism. Key goals include reinforcing economic and investment activities, increasing non-oil international trade, and promoting a softer and more secular image of the Kingdom. It also consists of increasing government spending on the military, as well as manufacturing equipment and ammunition.

The first details were announced on 25 April 2016 by Crown Prince Mohammed bin Salman. The Council of Ministers has tasked the Council of Economic and Development Affairs (CEDA) with identifying and monitoring the mechanisms and measures crucial for the implementation of "Saudi Arabia's Vision 2030".

In 2021, The Guardian wrote despite Saudi Arabia's commitment to diversify its economy, the government was still 74% dependent on oil exports for its budget.

Description 
Oil revenue accounts for 30-40% of the real GDP of Saudi Arabia, not including the proportion of the economy that is also dependent on oil distribution. Decreasing this dependence on oil resources has been one of the goals of the government since the 1970s. Oil and other natural wealth in countries that depend on these resources as a major source of income have been described as the "resource curse". However, the implementation of this goal has been unstable and remains largely dependent on the price of oil. The core priority is to be able to develop alternative sources of revenue for the government, such as taxes, fees, and income from the sovereign wealth fund. Another major aspect is to lower the dependency of the country's citizens on public spending by spending on subsidies, higher salaries and increasing the portion of the economy contributed by the private sector to provide more employment opportunities. The goals in Saudi Vision 2030 could be compared with other development plans in the Middle East, for example, Kuwait Vision 2035, Egypt Vision 2030 and UAE Vision 2021.

The vision has three main pillars: to make the country the "heart of the Arab and Islamic worlds", to become a global investment powerhouse, and to transform the country's location into a hub connecting Afro-Eurasia.

The plan is supervised by a group of people employed under the National Center for Performance Measurement, the Delivery Unit, and the Project Management Office of the Council of Economic and Development Affairs. The National Transformation Program was designed and launched in 2016 across 24 government bodies.

Saudi Vision 2030 lays out targets for diversification and improving competitiveness. It is built around three main themes which set out specific objectives that are to be achieved by 2030:
 A vibrant society – urbanism, culture and entertainment, sports, Umrah, UNESCO heritage sites, life expectancy
 A thriving economy – employment, women in the workforce, international competitiveness, Public Investment Fund, foreign direct investment, non-oil exports
 An ambitious nation – non-oil revenues, government effectiveness, e-government, household savings and income, non-profits, and volunteering.

Projects and initiatives 
The PIF organizes an annual investment forum, the Future Investment Initiative, in Riyadh. However, amid the rising controversy and escalating tensions due to the Kingdom's alleged involvement in Jamal Khashoggi's murder, many international companies have backed out of the conference. Google Cloud, KKR & Co. L.P., Ford Motor, JPMorgan Chase, BlackRock, Uber, and The Blackstone Group all withdrew their CEO/chairmen's names from the summit that was held on 23 October 2018. Major media houses including CNN, Bloomberg, CNBC, the New York Times, Fox Business Network, the Financial Times, the Los Angeles Times, and Huffington Post also withdrew as partners.

National Transformation Program 
On 7 June 2016, the Council of Ministers approved the National Transformation Program which set out the goals and targets to be achieved by 2020. It is the first of three 5-year phases. Each phase will contribute towards achieving a number of goals and targets that put the Kingdom on track to reach the ultimate goals of Vision 2030. In addition, to assist the Kingdom in financing the projects to be developed and facilitate the process of achieving goals and targets, Crown Prince Mohammad bin Salman announced in January 2016 that an IPO of Saudi Aramco would take place. However, only 5% of the company will be made public.

In March 2019, Aramco released its financial statements, disclosing a net income of $111.1 billion in 2018. In June 2019, the Financial Times reported that Aramco is striving to separate its association with the Ministry of Investment, ahead of its potential listing. The company had been paying Ministry-related expenses, according to unnamed sources. The report revealed that Khalid Al-Falih had been using the company's revenues for his expenses, either directly relevant to Aramco or otherwise diplomatic. However, Falih's ally stated that his policies have brought in greater revenues for the firm.

The two massive tourism projects along the Red Sea planned by the Saudi government were to be run under the directorship of Richard Branson. On 11 October 2018, Branson stated that he is suspending his advisory role for the two projects amidst the Jamal Khashoggi murder. Branson also suspended talks with the Saudi government about investment in Virgin Galactic. He said he had "high hopes for the current government in the Kingdom and its leader Crown Prince Mohammed bin Salman…the disappearance of journalist Jamal Khashoggi, if proved true, would clearly change the ability of any of us in the West to do business with the Saudi Government."

Entertainment sector 
In May 2016, a General Authority for Entertainment was announced by royal decree, into which over $2 billion have been invested. In Riyadh, the first public live music concert in over 25 years was held in May 2017, which featured American country musician Toby Keith and Saudi singer Rabeh Sager. In April 2017, the government announced a  sports, culture, and entertainment complex at Al-Qidiya, south-west of Riyadh. The project will include a Six Flags theme park, due to open in 2022.

As a component of Vision 2030, there was a celebration of the 87th anniversary of the founding of the country with concerts and performances. Women were for the first time allowed into Riyadh's King Fahd International Stadium.

On 5 March 2018, the General Sports Authority announced a 10-year partnership with American professional wrestling promoter World Wrestling Entertainment (WWE) to hold annual pay-per-view events in Saudi Arabia. The first event, Greatest Royal Rumble, was held on 27 April 2018 at King Abdullah Sports City in Jeddah. Due to restrictions on women's rights, WWE's female performers were not initially featured in these events. The first exception to this occurred at Crown Jewel on 31 October 2019, which featured Lacey Evans and Natalya in the first women's professional wrestling match to be held in Saudi Arabia. In observation of conservative dress, they both wore black leggings and T-shirts over bodysuits instead of their normal ring attire. Women's matches have featured on the events since then.

Saudi Arabia lifted its 35-year moratorium on the construction of new movie theaters in the country, with the first new theatre, owned by AMC Theatres, opening on 18 April 2018 in Riyadh.

In December 2019, the MDL Beast music festival was held in Riyadh, attracting 200,000 visitors over three days, and featuring acts such as Afrojack, David Guetta, J Balvin, Monsta X, and R3hab.

In January 2020, Saudi Arabia unveiled plans to build a new racing circuit in Qiddiya designed by former Formula One driver Alexander Wurz, aiming to host F1 or MotoGP events as early as 2023. In November 2020, Formula One Managers announced that a race would be held at the new circuit in 2021.

Women's rights 

In early 2017, Saudi state schools announced that they would be offering physical education classes to both boys and girls starting in the fall of 2017. Later that year, the state announced that they would allow women to attend sports events, including those inside sports stadiums. On 26 September 2017, a royal decree was issued granting women the right to drive vehicles which took effect in June 2018.

While changes to the law have been implemented for the welfare of women, some argue more progress still needs to be made. The case of Israa al-Ghomgham came to light after she and her husband were arrested in December 2015 for calling for the release of political prisoners and an end to anti-Shia government discrimination. Saudi prosecutors are seeking death penalty for Ghomgham.

In 2019, the government-based web application Absher gained media attention and was criticized for tracking the movement of the women of the kingdom. The app, which promotes a male guardianship system, allows men to manage women's lives digitally by specifying where and when a woman can travel. The app also sends alerts to men's phones if a woman uses her passport at the border. The European Parliament and United States Congress condemned the app and urged the Kingdom to abolish its male guardianship system.

In August 2019, Saudi Arabia lifted travel restrictions on women and granted greater control to those above the age of 21.

As part of its plan to modernize, Saudi Arabia was adopting changes to enhance women's rights and gender equality. However, the country was being criticized, where human rights groups said that all its efforts "are not serious and fall within the whitewashing campaigns it is carrying out to improve its human rights record". It was after Saudi authorities detained a 34-year-old woman, Salma al-Shehab, and sentenced her to 34 years in prison. Shehab, a Ph.D. student of Leeds University, was in Saudi on vacation since the end of 2019. In January 2021, she was detained for her activity on Twitter, where she followed and retweeted activists and dissidents. She was sentenced to six years at the end of 2021, but the sentence was increased to 34 years after she appealed. The court also ruled for a subsequent 34-year travel ban, confiscation of her mobile phone, and for her Twitter account to be "closed down permanently". Shehab was reported on a Saudi-based crime-reporting app, Kollona Amn, or We Are All Security, by a user. Rights groups condemned Shehab's sentence, which they called evidence of Prince Mohammed's crackdown on dissent.

Tourism visa 
To advance the Saudi Vision 2030, Saudi Arabia formally announced on 27 September 2019 the issuance of the tourist visa allowing visitors from 49 countries to visit the country up to 90 days for a fee of $80. The visa can be either obtained online (eVisa) or on arrival.

Other projects 
Some of the other major projects to be developed are listed in the table below:

Implementation

Vision Realization Programs 
To achieve the strategic goals and targets of vision 2030, thirteen programs called Vision Realization Programs (VRPs) were established. The VRPs were presented by Council of Economic and Development Affairs (CEDA) on 24 April 2017:

Quality of Life Program
 Financial Sector Development Program
 Housing Program
 Fiscal Balance Program
National Transformation Program
Public Investment Fund Program
 Privatization Program
 National Companies Promotion Program
 National Industrial Development and Logistics Program
 Strategic Partnerships Program
 Hajj and Umrah Program
 Human Capital Development Program
 Saudi Character Enrichment Program

Supervision 
The plan is supervised by Crown Prince Mohammad bin Salman. Overall, Vision 2030's directions and decision-making roles lie within a Council of Ministers and a Council of Economic and Development Affairs (CEDA). CEDA's director, as well as the managers of the first 12 Vision Realization Programs, ensure proper adherence to the plan on the five-year level. Annually, each entity concerned is individually responsible for its budget and objectives.

Government entities reorganization 
To achieve the strategic objectives of Vision 2030, new government entities were created and existing entities were reorganized and/or merged.

Critical reactions 
The IMF's report on Saudi Arabia a few months following the announcement of Vision 2030 explained that the fiscal deficit in the Saudi economy would continue to narrow in 2016. It also claimed that recent, major government deposits at the Saudi Arabian Monetary Authority (SAMA) acted as policy buffers to smooth the transition that the plan requires. In 2016, the IMF publicly warned that Saudi Arabia risks having no more foreign reserve currency within a 5-year period. In 2017, it projected that SAMA's net foreign assets would continue to decline, though remaining at a "comfortable level". It expects that the fiscal deficit will continue to improve over the coming years, also noting that non-performing loans remained low, despite a slight increase in 2017.

Over 300 specific targets for 2020 have been announced across 25 government entities as part of the National Transformation Plan. The NTP brings over 150 expected initial public offerings. However, reports noted the "key person dependency" on Crown Prince Mohammad bin Salman of the Vision and the NTP. Other criticisms have been regarding the lack of information about the detailed plans to accompany the intended transformation.

Certain journalists speculated that the plan's goals were overly ambitious, and noted that non-oil growth so far was insufficient and would threaten the plan's successful implementation. One report felt that despite the national plan's overall forward-thinking direction, "political reform appears to be absent from the policy agenda".

Reactions were mixed following the announcement that Saudi Arabia would lift the driving ban on women. Similarly to the overarching Vision 2030, some understood the announcement via royal decree as acquiescing to outside pressure, while others applauded the move.

According to a research paper written by Jane Kinninmont for Chatham House, the structural disadvantages of the country such as weak institutions, inefficient bureaucracy, and significant skill gaps between labor demands and the education system hinder the growth prospects of the country. Rebalancing the job market in the private sector will also prove to be a challenge since it is currently mostly staffed by expatriates. One of the difficulties is that the private sector has lower salaries and expats are easier to hire and fire. Currently, twice as many Saudi nationals work in the public sector as in the private sector. The challenge lies in getting a larger portion of nationals to accept lower-paying jobs with more hours than typical public jobs. The private sector must also be moved away from business activities that require very low-cost labor.

According to Hilal Khashan, from the U.S. conservative think tank Middle East Forum, to have the 2030 plan succeed ignoring the relationship between economic and political development is no longer a viable option, the developments required to increase the GDP as planned will encourage the breakage of the tribal system taking place. Another aspect is the "zero tolerance to corruption" that may be very difficult to achieve with a "society where family, tribal, and regional ties are stronger than the nebulous conception of state identity".

The hosting of sporting events in Saudi Arabia under the strategy have been described as attempts to sportswash the country's human rights record.

A 16 May 2020 article by The New York Times quoted a Middle East analyst at the Royal United Services Institute in London, Michael Stephens critically commenting on Saudi Arabia's Vision 2030. He stated, "I think Vision 2030 is more or less over, I think it's finished," following the financial crisis faced by the country amid the coronavirus spread and falling oil prices, which has also led the kingdom to delay mega projects such as the Neom city, according to the Saudi finance minister, Mohammed al-Jadaan.

In June 2020, following the killing of Abdulraheem al-Huwaiti of Huwait tribe, Saudi Crown Prince Mohammed bin Salman, hired a US Public Relations and Communications firm  Ruder Finn, to counter the negative aspects of NEOM City project. The country signed a contract worth $1.7 million, despite the ongoing COVID-19 crisis.

After the assassination of Jamal Khashoggi, there has been a general reluctance among the international community to invest in Saudi Arabia. In addition, assets were moved overseas and the Gulf became economically unattractive. Despite this, foreign investments in the country rose in 2018 by 110% over the previous year, according to the Ministry of Economy and Planning.

In 2021, Saudi Arabia hired the Boston Consulting Group, and some other Western consultants, regarding its interest in bidding for the hosting rights of the 2030 FIFA World Cup. These companies were given the responsibility of analyzing the possibilities of a Saudi bid. However, the bid was a big shot and went against FIFA's policy of continental rotation. The football federation's rules blocked the Asian Football Confederation (AFC) countries to host the World Cup until 2034, as Qatar was already hosting the tournament in 2022. Yet, uncertainties were there as Mohammed bin Salman maintained close ties with FIFA's President Gianni Infantino. For the Vision 2030 program, Saudi has a major focus on sports, where it successfully signed contracts with Italy and Spain to host their domestic cup finals. In October 2021, as a part of a consortium, the PIF obtained an 80% stake in Premier League club Newcastle United. After a previous attempt to take over the club in 2020, failed. The country was also set to launch its own sports channel. However, it still wasn't able to obtain the broadcast rights to the UEFA Champions League . Moreover, human rights groups have also been vocally opposing the Kingdom's efforts to stage major sports events, particularly after the assassination of Jamal Khashoggi.

In October 2021, Saudi authorities initiated a large-scale demolition and eviction plan for the Jeddah Central Project launched in December. The demolitions affected 558,000 people in more than 60 neighbourhoods. Amnesty International confirmed through official documents that some of the residents were notified about evictions only 24 hours before, while others were between 1–6 weeks. In some cases "evacuate" was written on the buildings, while the state media and billboards informed others about the demolitions to others. The state media was also spreading a narrative about the residents, stating that the majority of them were undocumented. It was claimed the neighbourhoods were "rife with diseases, crime, drugs and theft". In January 2022, Saudi authorities announced a compensation scheme, which didn't cover the foreign nationals that accounted for 47% of those evicted. The compensation value was to be appraised after the demolitions. Residents said the communities were being "destroyed" and it was difficult for the migrants to afford alternate housing. Some even complain about delays in compensation.

In July 2022, Mohammed bin Salman released a promotional video, taking further the plans to build a 105-mile-long linear city, dubbed as The Line. Part of Neom, the project was designed to incorporate flying cars, robotic maids and an artificial moon between two parallel mirrored buildings. However, critics said it will create a "dystopian" facility. They were concerned that the utopian idea of The Line will harm the environment. Besides, it will also impact the movement of birds and other animals. A senior adviser to the New Urban Mobility Alliance, Carlos Felipe Pardo said, "This seems impossible, greatly limited or just plain artificial." The project also remained questionable due to the possibility of its completion. It was noted that it could take nearly 50 years to give life to the idea, but urban planners of "The Line" were under a pressure to complete it by 2030. Moreover, some of the Saudi's paused ambitious projects of the past also left the linear city's construction idea in doubt.

See also

 Economy of Saudi Arabia
 MiSK Foundation

References

External links
 Official website

Economic history of Saudi Arabia
Economy of Saudi Arabia
2016 in Saudi Arabia
2030
Projects established in 2016
2030 in Saudi Arabia
Future vision statements of countries